Eric Melear is an American Associate Conductor and Assistant Chorus Master who became known for conducting a play called Alcina which opened at the Wolf Trap Barns in 2008. In 1995 he graduated from the Luther College where he mastered in music as well as mathematics. As of 2003 he works as a conductor at the Wolf Trap Opera Company and is an associate music director at the Houston Grand Opera in Houston, Texas. Prior to joining those companies he worked for Hal Leonard as freelance pianist as well as an economist in marketing department at Florentine Opera where he also got his master's degree. After completion of his courses he left Vienna, Virginia and went to Vienna, Austria where he became a répétiteur at the Vienna State Opera.

References

External links

American male conductors (music)
20th-century births
Living people
Luther College (Iowa) alumni
Date of birth missing (living people)
21st-century American conductors (music)
21st-century American male musicians
Year of birth missing (living people)